Christine Lavin (born January 2, 1952) is a New York City-based singer-songwriter and promoter of contemporary folk music. She has recorded numerous solo albums, and has also recorded with other female folk artists under the name Four Bitchin' Babes. She is known for her sense of humor, which is expressed in both her music and her onstage performances. Many of her songs alternate between comedy and emotional reflections on romance.

Lavin worked at Caffe Lena in Saratoga Springs, New York until Dave Van Ronk convinced her to move to New York City and make a career as a singer-songwriter. She followed his advice and accepted his offer of guitar lessons. She was the original host of Sunday Breakfast on WFUV in New York City and a founding member of the Four Bitchin' Babes when they were formed in 1990.

She is a lifelong astrophysics hobbyist and has included those themes in her music.

Awards
 The ASCAP 43rd Annual Deems Taylor Award for her book Cold Pizza For Breakfast: A Mem-Wha??, 2011
 The ASCAP Foundation Jamie deRoy and Friends Award, 2010
 Top 100 of the Most Influential Artists in the Last 15 Years, Singer Songwriter Magazine
 Top 30 iPod Singer/Songwriters of Choice, WUMB, Boston 2006
 ASCAP Composer Award 1992, 1993, 1996, 1998, 1999, 2004, 2005, 2006
 Singer/Songwriter of the Year, Backstage Magazine, NYC 2001
 Honorable Mention, NAIRD Singer / Songwriter Album of the Year, 1996: Please Don’t Make Me Too Happy
 New York Music Award Folk Artist of the Year 1990, 1992
 World Folk Music Association Kate Wolf Memorial Award 1990
 NAIRD Folk Album of the Year, 1988: Good Thing He Can’t Read My Mind

Discography

 Absolutely Live (1981; re-issued by Winthrop, 2000)
 Future Fossils (Philo, 1984)
 Beau Woes and Other Problems of Modern Life (Philo, 1986)
 Another Woman's Man (Philo, 1987)
 Good Thing He Can't Read My Mind (Philo, 1988)
 Attainable Love (Philo, 1990)
 Compass (Philo, 1991)
 Live at the Cactus Cafe: What Was I Thinking? (Philo, 1993)
 Please Don't Make Me Too Happy (Shanachie, 1995)
 Shining My Flashlight on the Moon (Shanachie, 1997)
 One Wild Night in Concert (1998)
 Getting in Touch With My Inner Bitch (Christine Lavin, 1999)
 The Bellevue Years (Philo, 2000)
 The Subway Series (Christine Lavin, 2001)
 Final Exam (2001)
 I Was in Love With a Difficult Man (Redwing, 2002)
 The Runaway Christmas Tree (2003)
 Sometimes Mother Really Does Know Best [Live] (Appleseed, 2004)
 folkZinger (Appleseed, 2005)
 One Meat Ball (Appleseed, 2006)
 The Runaway Christmas Tree (Appleseed, 2006)
 Happydance of the Xenophobe (2007)
 I Don't Make This Stuff Up, I Just Make It Rhyme (2008)
 Cold Pizza for Breakfast (Yellow Tail Records, 2009)
 If You're Drunk You Cannot Buy A Puppy (Christine Lavin, 2014)
 Spaghettification (Christine Lavin, 2017)
 On My Way To Hooterville (2020)

References

External links
 Official Christine Lavin site

1952 births
Living people
American women singer-songwriters
American comedy musicians
American folk guitarists
American folk singers
Fast Folk artists
Singer-songwriters from New York (state)
Four Bitchin' Babes members
Place of birth missing (living people)
Guitarists from New York (state)
20th-century American guitarists
WFUV people
20th-century American women guitarists
21st-century American women